Night Falls is the seventh studio album released by American hip-hop group Heiruspecs. It was released on April 22, 2014 independently. It is the band's first full-length LP since 2008's self-titled album.

Track listing

References

Heiruspecs albums
2014 albums